Hillshire Farm is an American brand of meat products marketed and owned by Hillshire Brands. The company was founded in 1934, and was purchased by Sara Lee Corporation in 1971. Friedrich (Fritz) Bernegger, (February 2, 1904 – April 30, 1988) born in Austria, started the business at the facility in New London, Wisconsin.

Hillshire Farm's primary products are smoked sausage and Polska kielbasa. The brand introduced smoked sausages to much of the general population of the U.S. as a supermarket food and a nationally advertised food. Hillshire Farm sausages are about two feet long and in the same shape as a ring bologna.

Due to the popularity of the Hillshire Farms brand of meat products, the Sara Lee Corporation spun off into two companies, the "Hillshire Brands" company and "Sara Lee", in 2012. In 2014, Tyson Foods bought the "Hillshire Brands Company" and remains the current owner of the brand.

Other products

"Lit'l Smokies", a line of bite-sized smoked sausages
Packaged deli-sliced meats for sandwiches
Summer sausage, marketed mostly during the Christmas holiday
Traditional bone-in hams which are either unsliced or spiral sliced
Ball park hot dogs
State Fair corn dogs

See also

 List of smoked foods

References

External links
 Official website

Brand name meats
Sara Lee Corporation brands
Smoked meat
Sausage companies of the United States
1934 establishments in Wisconsin
American companies established in 1934
Food and drink companies established in 1934
Food and drink companies based in Wisconsin
Tyson Foods